Tachina testaceipes is a species of fly in the genus Tachina of the family Tachinidae that is endemic to England.

References

Insects described in 1829
Diptera of Europe
Endemic fauna of England
testaceipes